"Poison Prince" is the first single from Scottish singer-songwriter Amy MacDonald's debut album, This Is the Life, and charted at number 136 on the UK Singles Chart in 2007. Its initial limited release was on 7 May 2007, and it was later re-released 19 May 2008. The lyrics were based on the life of Babyshambles and The Libertines singer Pete Doherty, and were written as an ode to the troubled musician.

Limited release 
"Poison Prince" was initially offered as a limited online-only release, and was included as the third track on her debut album This Is The Life, released 7 May 2007. The music video features Amy performing in a nightclub and walking around various locations in Glasgow.

Re-release 
On 19 May 2008, a year and 12 days after the limited release was released, a new music video for the song "Poison Prince" was released. The video was filmed at her Rock Against Racism show in Troon, South Ayrshire, Scotland.

Track listings
 CD single
 "Poison Prince" – 3:28
 "Rock Bottom" – 3:44

 Digital download
 "Poison Prince" – 3:28
 "Footballer's Wife" – 5:06
 "Rock Bottom" – 3:44

 CD single (2009, Germany)
 "Poison Prince" – 3:28
 Multimedia: "Poison Prince (2nd video)"

Charts

References

External links
 Poison Prince music video on youtube
 Poison Prince Lyrics

2007 debut singles
Songs written by Amy Macdonald
Amy Macdonald songs
2007 songs